The Carpolac Railway Line was a railway line located in the Wimmera region of Victoria that branched off of the Serviceton railway line at Horsham railway station, Victoria. It was opened from Horsham to East Natimuk in August 1887, East Natimuk to Goroke in July 1894 and then from Goroke to Carpolac in May 1927 and closed on December 8, 1986.

Line Guide 
Branched from the Serviceton railway line at Horsham station

Remlaw Siding

Vectis

Quantong

East Natimuk junction with the Balmoral railway line

Natimuk

Arapiles

Mitre (formerly St Mary's/Mitre Lake)

Duffholme

Gymbowen

Goroke

Mortat

Carpolac

History 
The line was opened in stages from Horsham to East Natimuk in August 1887, East Natimuk to Goroke in July 1894 and Goroke to Carpolac in 1927. It closed from East Natimuk to Carpolac on December 8, 1986 however the last train on the line ran in February of 1986.

in 1910 the railway line in Mitre (formerly St Mary's then known as Mitre Lake) was flooded due to it running at a low elevation through the Mitre Swamp, this resulted in the line being suspended beyond Mitre. A deviation around the swamp was constructed a short time later and the original line was dismantled and formed the main road to Goroke.

Beginning in 1937 and lasting until April 1965 there was a daily mail/passenger train between Horsham/Carpolac. Sometime during the line's life, there was also a daily goods train.

During the 1968-69 grain harvest, the line saw a record number of trains with up to 10 trains a day in operation.. Over the period of the grain harvest, 17,325 wagons of grain were transported along the line as it was transported entirely by rail.

References 

Closed regional railway lines in Victoria (Australia)
Railway lines opened in 1887
Railway lines closed in 1986